Joseph Conrad (1857–1924) was a Polish-British novelist.

Joseph Conrad may also refer to:
 Joseph Conrad (French colonel) (1788–1837), French colonel killed in action at the Battle of Barbastro
 Joseph Conrad (general) (1830–1897), American Civil War general
 Joseph Conrad Chamberlin (1898–1962), American arachnologist
 Joe Conrad (1930–2018), American golfer
 Joseph Conrad (ship), an 1882 museum ship